Richard Joseph Egan (June 23, 1884 – July 7, 1947) was a shortstop/second baseman who played in Major League Baseball from  through  for the Cincinnati Reds (1908–1913), Brooklyn Robins (1914–1915) and Boston Braves (1915–1916). Egan batted and threw right-handed. He was born in Portland, Oregon, and attended Fordham University.

In a nine-season career, Egan was a .249 hitter with four home runs and 292 RBI in 917 games played, including 374 runs, 87 doubles, 29 triples and 167 stolen bases. 
 
Egan died in Oakland, California, at the age of 63.

See also
List of Major League Baseball career stolen bases leaders

External links
Baseball Library
Baseball Reference
Retrosheet

Boston Braves players
Brooklyn Robins players
Cincinnati Reds players
Major League Baseball second basemen
Major League Baseball shortstops
1884 births
1947 deaths
Fordham Rams baseball players
San Francisco Seals (baseball) players
Superior Longshoremen players
Peoria Distillers players
Seattle Siwashes players
Harrisburg Senators players
Baseball players from Portland, Oregon
Los Angeles (minor league baseball) players